This is a list of full-power television stations in the United States having call signs which begin with the letter K. Stations licensed to transmit under low-power specifications—ex., KAJN-CD, K35OY-D and KXJB-LD—have not been included. This also pertains to low-power licenses transmitting over the spectrum of a full-power license. (KAZA-TV transmits over low-power KHTV-CD's spectrum, but is included as it is classified as a full-power license.)

A blue background indicates a station transmitting in the ATSC 3.0 format over-the-air; details about the station's alternate availability in the original ATSC format are contained in its article. Television networks listed with each respective station are the primary affiliation listed; details about other network affiliations with these channels are contained in their respective articles.

See also the list of TV stations beginning with W and the list of TV stations beginning with C.

See also
 Call signs in North America#United States
 List of United States over-the-air television networks

References